LCVP can refer to

Leaving Certificate Vocational Programme, an Irish education programme
Landing Craft Vehicle Personnel, a small military vessel for transfers from ship to shore during amphibious landings.
LCVP (Australia), modern Australian LCVP
LCVP (United Kingdom), modern British LCVP
LCVP (United States), the World War II craft used by the Allies